Bheema lift irrigation project or Rajiv Bheema Project is a lift irrigation canal project located in Narayanpet district in Telangana, India. Water is lifted at Panchdev Pahad from the back waters of Jurala Dam. Under the same project, another lift canal originates separately from the Ramanpahad balancing reservoir under Jurala left bank to irrigate the uplands.

The River Bhima originating from Western Ghats at Bhima Shankar near Karjat village in Maharashtra State is a tributary of Krishna River.
The length of Bhima River is 861.35 km (535 miles). The river Bhima has a total catchment area of 70613.70 km2 up to the confluence point with Krishna river. The catchment area of the proposed site near Sonna village is 53328 km2 and out of this 47760 km2 lies in Maharashtra State and remaining 5568 km2 lies in Karnataka State.

The Project

The scheme envisages construction of a Barrage across Bhima River near Sonna village of Afzalpur taluka in Gulbarga District to impound 89.65 M.Cum (3.16 TMC) of water.
The total water allocation for the scheme is 6.00 TMC, out of which 5.63 TMC of water is earmarked for irrigation purpose and balance 0.10 TMC of water for drinking and 0.27 TMC for industrial and other purpose. By utilizing 5.63 TMC it is proposed to irrigate 24,292 Ha of Culturable Command Area (CCA) and to benefit drought prone taluka of Afzalpur of Gulbarga district.

Details of Proposals
            
The lifts are proposed at two points.
 
 

Benefitted Mandals:-  The Mandals that would be benefited under the project are Magnur, Makthal, Narva, Atmakur, Chinnachintakunta, Wanaparthy, Peddamandadi, Pebbair, Pangal, Veepanagandla, Kollapur, Kothakota and Devarakadra of Mahabubnagar district.

References

External links 
 Water Resources Information System of India: Bhima Lift JI02715. Data as of March 2012. Retrieved 2014-12-25.

Irrigation in Telangana
Mahbubnagar district
Lift irrigation schemes